Bresnica is a Serbo-Croatian toponym. It may refer to:

 Bresnica, Croatia
 Bresnica, Bosilegrad, Serbia
 Bresnica, Čačak, Serbia
 Bresnica, Koceljeva, Serbia
 Bresnica, Vranje, Serbia
 Bresnica, Zvečan, Kosovo
 Bresnica, Slovenia

See also
Breznica (disambiguation)
Brusnica (disambiguation)

Serbo-Croatian place names